Natribacillus  is a Gram-positive, moderately halophilic, alkalitolerant, spore-forming, aerobic and motile genus of bacteria from the family of Bacillaceae with one known species (Natribacillus halophilus). Natribacillus halophilus has been isolated from garden soil from Okabe in Japan.

References

Bacillaceae
Bacteria genera
Monotypic bacteria genera